Artistic swimming as Synchronized swimming at the 2010 Asian Games was held in Foshan Aquatics Centre, Foshan, China from November 19 to 21, 2010. Only women's events were held in three competitions. China dominated the competition by winning all three gold medals ahead of Japan with three silver medals.

Schedule

Medalists

Medal table

Participating nations
A total of 69 athletes from 9 nations competed in artistic swimming at the 2010 Asian Games:

References
 Results

External links 
 Olympic Council of Asia

 
2010
2010 Asian Games events
Asian Games